Arthur Richard Rivers  (1857–1940) was Dean of Hobart from 1920 to 1940.

Early life 
Rivers was born in Teignmouth and educated at St John's College, Oxford. His younger brother was Richard Godfrey Rivers, an artist and gallery curator.

Religious life 
Ordained in 1882 Rivers began his career with   a curacy in Painswick. Emigrating to Australia he was Precentor of Sydney Cathedral and Chaplain to the Primate of Australia. Moving to Queensland he was  Rector of St Michael, Brisbane and then St Andrew in the same city. He was Archdeacon of Burnett and Wide Bay from 1896 to 1905; and of Toowoomba from then until his appointment as Dean of Hobert.

Later life 
Rivers died on 1 November 1940.

References

1857 births
People from Teignmouth
Alumni of St John's College, Oxford
Archdeacons of Burnett and Wide Bay
Archdeacons of Toowoomba
Deans of Hobart
1940 deaths
Australian composers
Australian male composers
English emigrants to colonial Australia